Hypulus is a genus of beetles belonging to the family Melandryidae. The species of this genus are found in Europe and North America

Species
The following species are recognised in the genus Hypulus:
 Hypulus bifasciatus (Fabricius, 1792)
 Hypulus californicus Van Dyke, 1928
 Hypulus cingulatus Lewis, 1895
 Hypulus quercinus (Quensel, 1790)
 Hypulus simulator Newman, 1838

References

Melandryidae